Renuka Sagara, also known as Malaprabha reservoir and Navilutheertha reservoir, is a dam and impounding reservoir constructed across the Malaprabha River in the Krishna River basin. It is situated at Navilatirtha village in Savadatti Taluk Taluk of Belgaum district in North Karnataka, India. The dam is 43.13 metres high and has 4 vertical crest gates; it impounds a large reservoir with a gross surface area of 54.97 square kilometres, and storage capacity of 37.73 thousand million cubic feet. It is an earthen and masonry dam which caters to the Irrigation needs for over 540,000 acres, and hydroelectric power generation.

See also

List of dams and reservoirs in Karnataka

References

Dams in Karnataka
Hydroelectric power stations in Karnataka
Reservoirs in Karnataka
Geography of Bagalkot district
Buildings and structures in Bagalkot district
Tourist attractions in Bagalkot district
1972 establishments in Mysore State
Dams completed in 1972
20th-century architecture in India